Manuel Barroso (born 14 August 1931) is a Portuguese rower. He competed in the men's double sculls event at the 1972 Summer Olympics.

References

External links
 

1931 births
Possibly living people
Portuguese male rowers
Olympic rowers of Portugal
Rowers at the 1972 Summer Olympics
Place of birth missing (living people)